Astragalus pomonensis is a species of milkvetch known by the common name Pomona milkvetch. It is native to Baja California and southern California, where it can be found in a number of coastal habitats, including the California Coast Ranges. This is a bushy perennial herb forming a clump of thick, hollow stems up to about 80 centimeters tall. Leaves are up to 20 centimeters long and are made up of many oval-shaped leaflets each up to 3 centimeters in length. The inflorescence is a large array of up to 45 cream-colored flowers. Each flower is between one and two centimeters long. The fruit is a bladdery legume pod which dries to a thin, almost transparent papery texture. It may exceed 4 centimeters in length and generally drops off the plant when dry.

External links
Jepson Manual Treatment
USDA Plants Profile
Photo gallery

pomonensis
Flora of Baja California
Flora of California
Flora without expected TNC conservation status